The Spanish Fly (German: Die spanische Fliege) is a 1913 German comedy play written by Franz Arnold and Ernst Bach. When it premiered Arnold himself played the male lead. It was the first of many successful collaborations between the two writers.

Adaptations
It has been adapted for film and television several times including:
 The Spanish Fly, a 1931 film by Georg Jacoby
 The Spanish Fly, a 1955 film by Carl Boese.

References

Bibliography
 Grange, William. Historical Dictionary of German Literature to 1945. Scarecrow Press, 2010. 

1913 plays
German plays adapted into films
Plays by Franz Arnold
Plays by Ernst Bach